Quinton Peron is an American cheerleader. In 2019, he and Napoleon Jinnies were the first male National Football League (NFL) cheerleaders to perform during the Super Bowl.

Peron, an openly gay African American man (as is Jinnies), is a classically trained dancer.

Television appearances
He appeared on To Tell the Truth in a 2020 episode. In 2022, Peron competed on the thirty-fourth season of the CBS reality competition show The Amazing Race.

See also
 List of cheerleaders

References

Living people
American male dancers
American LGBT people
National Football League cheerleaders
Year of birth missing (living people)
The Amazing Race (American TV series) contestants